Wikilala, nicknamed as Google of Ottoman Turkish, is a Turkish digital library of Ottoman Turkish textual materials. Wikilala, which is currently in its beta version, consists more than 109,000 printed Ottoman Turkish textual materials, including over 45,000 newspapers, 32,000 journals, 4,000 books and 26,000 articles. Wikilala, provides its users with full-text search through its database using Ottoman Turkish alphabet or Turkish alphabet.

History 
The project was started in 2019 by Sadi Özgür, lecturer of Department of History, Istanbul Aydın University. He started the project in collaboration with Harun Tuncer, a project consultant. The library consists of a detailed account of Ottoman literature, social and cultural life, and the political environment of the Empire.

Digitalisation 
Document digitalisation involves various stages. A document is scanned or digitalized with high resolutions using modern devices. However, if a document is already digitalized, it can be uploaded directly. Digitalized documents are uploaded to the website with a searchable mechanism.

Features 
All uploaded documents becomes accessible through an Optical character recognition (OCR) technique, allowing a user to find relevant information in Latin and Arabic texts.

The website, which is in beta version, has received over 200,000 visitors from 107 countries since its launch in 2019.

Other works 
The Turkish dictionary titled el-Hazînetü'l-Azîziye fi'l-Lügati'l-Osmâniyye by Sir James Redhouse was lost in the country, however it was discovered and digitalized by Wikilala. Redhouse took twenty years to create that dictionary in 10 volumes.

Awards 
Wikilala was awarded Innovative Initiative of the Year Award by the Ministry of Culture and Tourism in April 2021 for its role in preserving Ottoman history.

References 

Full-text scholarly online databases
Scholarly search services
Computer-related introductions in 2019
2019 establishments in Turkey